Duplje is a settlement in the Vipava Valley in the Municipality of Vipava in the Littoral region of Slovenia.

References

External links 
Duplje at Geopedia

Populated places in the Municipality of Vipava